The Bayer designations m Carinae and M Carinae are distinct.

for m Carinae, see HD 83944
for M Carinae, see HD 88981

Carinae, m
Carina (constellation)